Guillaume Rozier (born in April 1996) is a French engineer, data aggregator, consultant in data science, qualified on January 5, 2021 by the daily Les Echos as a "Most mediated Data Scientist of the moment". He is at the origin of website CovidTracker who regroup data about Covid-19 in France. Also, this website hosts VaccinTracker and ViteMaDose who regroup available appointments for the vaccination against Covid-19.

Biography

Family and childhood 
Guillaume Rozier was born in April 1996 from a father who is computer scientist, and from a mother who is professor of physics.

When he was a teenager, he says he was interested about physics, meteorology and mathematics.

Education 
Although earlier interested about IT, Guillaume Rozier didn't think he was a "geek" because he didn't know how to program when he got his scientific baccalaureate. After prep school in Champollion high-school at Grenoble, he joined Télécom Nancy in 2016. Also in 2018 he got a Master of Business Administration (MBA) from Telecom Business School. During his studies, he studied big-data applied in the medical sector.

Career 
Guillaume Rozier works henceforth for a French IT consulting group, a subsidiary of the American company Accenture.

CovidTracker and ViteMaDose 
Guillaume Rozier is famous for having created CovidTracker, a website aggregating data about Covid-19 in France, and also because he has created ViteMaDose ("QuickMyDose" in English) which allows people to find an appointment to be vaccinated against Covid-19. Indeed, ViteMaDose regroups the different appointment availability in the region.

Recognition 
On May 21, 2021, Guillaume Rozier was nominated exceptionally to the rank of Knight in the French National Order of Merit.

See also 
 Avi schiffmann

References 

French engineers

COVID-19 pandemic in France

1996 births

Living people